Dillwynia sericea, commonly known as showy parrot-pea, is a species of flowering plant in the family Fabaceae and is endemic to south-eastern Australia. It is an erect to low-lying shrub with hairy stems, linear leaves and apricot-coloured flowers, usually with a red centre.

Description
The standard petal is nearly twice as long as the sepals, often wider than long, apricot coloured with a red base.

Taxonomy and naming
Dillwynia sericea was first formally described in 1825 by Allan Cunningham in Barron Field's book, Geographical Memoirs on New South Wales. The specific epithet (sericea) means "silky".

Distribution
Showy parrot-pea grows in heath, woodland and forest and is widespread and common in eastern New South Wales, the Australian Capital Territory, Victoria and eastern Tasmania. It is also found in south-eastern Queensland and south-eastern South Australia.

References 

sericea
Fabales of Australia
Flora of New South Wales
Flora of Queensland
Flora of South Australia
Flora of Tasmania
Taxa named by Allan Cunningham (botanist)
Plants described in 1825